Hey Hey may refer to:

 Hey Hey, Iran, a village in Shirin Darreh Rural District, Iran
 Hey Hey (song), a song by Swami
 "Hey, Hey", a song by Dispatch from Silent Steeples
 "Hey Hey", a song by The Planet Smashers from No Self Control

See also
Hey Hey It's Saturday, an Australian television series
Hey (disambiguation)
Hey Hey Hey (disambiguation)
 "Hey-Hey-Hey-Hey!", a song written and first recorded by Little Richard